Vermont Route 4A (VT 4A) is a  east–west state highway in Rutland County, Vermont, United States. It runs from Fair Haven to West Rutland. VT 4A was the former alignment of U.S. Route 4 (US 4) before it was relocated to an expressway.

Route description
VT 4A begins at exit 1 of a four-lane U.S. Route 4 and goes into Fair Haven. It joins up with VT 22A and forms a brief concurrency in the center of town. The route then goes through the towns of Castleton (where it is known as Main Street and goes past Castleton University), Ira and West Rutland. The route ends at U.S. Route 4 Business in West Rutland.

Major intersections

References

External links

004A
Transportation in Rutland County, Vermont
U.S. Route 4
U.S. Highways in Vermont